The 2013–14 Bobsleigh World Cup was a multi-race tournament over the winter season for bobsleigh, organised by the FIBT, which also organised in parallel the 2013–14 Skeleton World Cup. The season started on 30 November 2013 in Calgary, Canada, and ended on 26 January 2014 in Königssee, Germany.

Calendar 
Below is the schedule of the 2013/14 season.
This edition was covering eight events on seven different tracks in five countries. The fact of having eight events in only seven tracks means that each discipline had one double race over the season.

Results

Two-man

Four-man

Two-woman

See also
 Bobsleigh at the 2014 Winter Olympics

References

External links 
 FIBT

Bobsleigh World Cup
World Cup
World Cup